Robert Malouf (27 July 1931 – 16 November 2019) was a Canadian boxer. He competed in the men's middleweight event at the 1952 Summer Olympics. He lost to Leen Jansen of the Netherlands in the round of 16.

References

1931 births
2019 deaths
Canadian male boxers
Olympic boxers of Canada
Boxers at the 1952 Summer Olympics
Boxers from Montreal
Middleweight boxers